The Smart Set Company was an African American touring revue company fronted by Sherman H. Dudley who took over for Tom McIntosh. Dudley signed a five-year contract in 1904 and was considered the show's "chief fun maker." Reviews of a performance in Indiana in 1902 refer to singing, dancing and "clever acrobatic work" calling it "the smartest colored comedy in all of America." Their performances, which were not entirely minstrel shows, were often commentaries on race in America "a composite study of the stage from a racial viewpoint" covering "every phase of stagedom."

In 1909, the group split into a Northern and Southern Smart Set Company with the latter being managed by Salem Tutt Whitney. Dudley retired from working with The Smart Set in 1912 and worked on building his chain of theaters. After 1917 Dudley devoted himself to producing black musicals, including updated Smart Set productions.

The name was used later to refer to other collections of actors and performers who worked on the circuit performing comedies and musicals for a theater season, a point which Dudley was somewhat churlish about. Notable companies were Shark's Smart Set Company, Tolliver's Smart Set Company and Gus Hill's Smart Set Company.

Performers
 Daisy M. Cheatham
 Sherman H. Dudley
 Ernest Hogan
 Billy McClain
 Tom McIntosh (comedian)
 Salem Tutt Whitney and J. Homer Tutt
 Aida Overton Walker

References

Vaudeville producers
Performing groups established in 1896
African-American cultural history
African-American theatre
Musical theatre
Performing arts companies